Trinity Blood is an anime series of twenty-four episodes produced by Gonzo based on a series of light novels of the same name by Sunao Yoshida. Directed by Tomohiro Hirata, it features character designs by Atsuko Nakajima and music by Takahito Eguchi. In a post-apocalyptic future, the series' main character, Abel Nightroad, a vampire feeding on the blood of other vampires, protects humanity in service of the Vatican. The series premiered on the Japanese satellite network Wowow from April 28 through October 6, 2005 and was first released on DVD from August 26, 2005 through July 28, 2006.

After producing an English dub for the series, Funimation Entertainment promoted it in the United States by combining the first four episodes into a ninety-minute film named Trinity Blood: Genesis and showing it in select theaters starting May 5, 2006. The series then premiered in English-language on the Canadian digital station Razer from July 6 through December 14, 2006. On DVD, Funimation's English adaptation was first made available in North America from September 26, 2006 through April 24, 2007, in Australia and New Zealand from December 6, 2006 to July 18, 2007, and in Europe from July 2, 2007 through May 26, 2008.

, performed by Buck-Tick with lyrics by Atsushi Sakurai, serves as opening theme for the series. Ending themes are "Broken Wings" and—for the final episode—"TB No. 45 Resolution", both performed by Tomoko Tane, who also wrote the songs' lyrics.

Episodes

Distribution

Japan
The series was originally released in Japan (Region 2) on August 26, 2005 and spanned twelve DVD volumes; the final volume was released on July 28, 2006. Each volume contains two episodes on a single disk and was made available in both regular and collector's editions. The regular editions include some extras, usually trailers and a booklet. The collector's editions come in higher-end packaging and contain more extras, including deluxe booklets with character profiles and tarot cards designed by Thores Shibamoto. The first six volumes include special "secret voice" CDs in addition to the extras. The final volume's collector's edition also includes a jigsaw puzzle and postcards designed by Shibamoto. The entire series was released in two DVD box sets, containing 12 episodes each, on November 28 and December 26, 2008.

International
In North America (Region 1), the series was released by Funimation Entertainment across six DVD volumes containing four episodes each, with English and Japanese audio tracks and English subtitles from September 26, 2006 through April 24, 2007. Similar to the release in Japan, each volume was made available in regular and limited edition versions. The regular editions have standard keep case covers, whereas the limited editions come in digipaks with slipcovers. The limited edition of each volume includes insert booklets and tarot cards that showcase original art and additional series information; the first volume's limited edition comes with a series box. Most of the volumes include cultural and historical notes as well. In November 13, 2007, the series was released in a complete box set, which includes tarot cards and four limited edition insert booklets. Six days later, Funimation began re-releasing the individual volumes as part of its value-priced Viridian Collection. On March 23, 2010, the entire series was released in a single Blu-ray collection.

Madman Entertainment released the series in Australia and New Zealand (Region 4) across six four-episode DVD volumes. The first volume, released on December 6, 2006, was also made available with a collector's box that is able to hold all six volumes. Each volume includes English and Japanese audio tracks, English subtitles, textless openings and endings, a digital gallery of the tarot cards that came with the original releases, reversible covers, and booklets. The final volume was released on July 18, 2007, followed by a DVD and Blu-ray box sets of the entire series on June 11, 2008 and March 16, 2011 respectively. In Europe (Region 2), MVM Entertainment released the series on DVD from July 2, 2007 through May 26, 2008 across six four-episode volumes without on-disc extras but including collectible tarot cards. A DVD collection box of the entire series followed on March 30, 2009.

See also

List of Trinity Blood chapters
List of Trinity Blood characters
List of Trinity Blood light novels

References

Trinity Blood